Isaac Rosa Camacho (born Seville, 1974) is a Spanish writer. He is best known for his novel El vano ayer which won the Premio Rómulo Gallegos in 2005. Rosa is the third Spanish writer to receive this award. Other noted works include El país del miedo and La habitación oscura.

Publications
 1999: El ruido del mundo [Extremadura 1936]. El gabinete de moscas de la mierda (1999) written by Isaac Rosa and José Israel García Vázquez
 1999: La malamemoria 
 2004: El vano ayer 
 2007: ¡Otra maldita novela sobre la guerra civil!, novel. Editorial Seix Barral.
 2008: El país del miedo, novel. Editorial Seix Barral. 
 2011: La mano invisible, novel. Editorial Seix Barral.
 2013: La habitación oscura, novel. Editorial Seix Barral.
 2018: Feliz final
 2022: Lugar seguro, novel, Editorial Seix Barral.

External links
 https://www.literaturfestival.com/autoren-en/autoren-2009-en/isaac-rosa

References

1974 births
Living people
Spanish writers
21st-century Spanish male writers
Spanish male writers